Wijebahukanda is a village in the Central Province of Sri Lanka.

See also
List of settlements in Central Province (Sri Lanka)

External links

Populated places in Nuwara Eliya District